The 2015 BeNe Ladies Tour is the second edition of the BeNe Ladies Tour, a women's cycling stage race in the Netherlands and Belgium. It is rated by the UCI as a category 2.2 race and is held between 17 and 19 July 2015.

Route

Stages

Stage 1
17 July 2015, – Philippine to Philippine,

Stage 2a
18 July 2015 – Sint-Laureins to Sint-Laureins, (individual time trial)

Stage 2b
18 July 2015 – Sint-Laureins to Sint-Laureins,

Stage 3
19 July 2015 – Zelzate to Zelzate,

Classification leadership

See also

 2015 in women's road cycling

References

External links

BeNe Ladies Tour
BeNe Ladies Tour